Raymond Leroy Bonney (April 5, 1892 – October 19, 1964) was an American ice hockey player who competed in the 1920 Summer Olympics. He was born in Phoenix, New York. He was the goaltender who competed in 1920 for the American ice hockey team, which won the silver medal.

References

External links
 
Raymond Bonney's profile at Sports Reference.com

1892 births
1964 deaths
American men's ice hockey goaltenders
Ice hockey players from New York (state)
Ice hockey players at the 1920 Summer Olympics
Medalists at the 1920 Summer Olympics
Olympic silver medalists for the United States in ice hockey
People from Phoenix, New York
Pittsburgh Athletic Association ice hockey players
Pittsburgh Yellow Jackets (USAHA) players
St. Paul Athletic Club ice hockey players